Leo Kahn (1894–1983) was a German-Israeli painter.

Biography
Kahn was born in 1894 in Bruchsal, Germany. He served in the German army in 1914, then studied at the Academy of Fine Arts in Karlsruhe between 1919-1920 under the tutelage of Albert Hueinsen. Kahn travelled to Berlin (where he met and befriended Max Liebermann), Holland, and France in search of artistic inspiration. In 1926, he was commissioned for the decoration of an important synagogue in Bruchsal. Kahn exhibited in Karlsruhe, Munich, Ulm, Zurich, and Paris. In 1928, Kahn lived in the south of France where he befriended the important Fauve artist André Derain. He then moved to Paris where he maintained a studio until 1934.

Kahn emigrated to Israel in 1936, settled in Ramat Gan and founded Israel's first textile printing factory.

In 1960, he moved to Safed's Artist Colony.

He is primarily remembered as a landscape, still life and portrait artist, and the influence of Paul Cézanne is deeply felt in his work.

Awards and honours
In 1950, Kahn participated in the Venice Biennale.
In 1957, he was a co-recipient of the Dizengoff Prize for Painting.
In 1982, he was made Worthy of the City of Ramat Gan.

Selected exhibitions
 2008/2009: Bruchsal, Townhall, Die entscheidende Tat des Malers Leo Kahn: Erinnerung an den Künstler der Bruchsaler Synagogenausmalung
 2001: Museum of the Holocaust, Los Angeles: Kaleidoscope: Works From the Collection of David Malek
 1981: Ulmer Museum, Germany (major retrospective)

Selected collections
 Israel Museum, Jerusalem
 Museum of the History of Łódź, Poland
 Tel-Aviv Museum of Art

References

Further reading
 Der Maler Leo Kahn, 1894-1983. Schönaich: G. Albert, 1986.
 Nobis, Norbert & Brigitte Kühn. Leo Kahn: Retrospektive [exhibition catalogue]. Ulm: Ulmer Museum, 1981.
 Siegel, Linda. Kaleidoscope: From Auschwitz to Art Connoisseur: The Story of the David Malek Collection (Featuring the Paintings of Leo Kahn, Samuel Tepler & Piero Cividalli) [exhibition catalogue]. Oak Park, CA: Elra Press, 2001.

External links
 Signum Foundation (Leo Kahn)
 Artnet.com (Leo Kahn)

1894 births
1983 deaths
Jewish painters
20th-century German painters
20th-century German male artists
German male painters
Jewish emigrants from Nazi Germany to Mandatory Palestine
Israeli portrait painters